Lustenau railway station is a railway station in the town of Lustenau, located in the district of Dornbirn in the Austrian state of Vorarlberg. It is an intermediate stop on the standard gauge St. Margrethen–Lauterach line of Austrian Federal Railways (ÖBB).

Services 
The following services stop at Lustenau:

References

External links 
 
 

Railway stations in Vorarlberg
Vorarlberg S-Bahn stations